The Silent Twins is a 1986 television film directed by Jon Amiel. It was broadcast as Season 2, Episode 2 of Screen Two. It was based on a 1986 book of the same title by Marjorie Wallace, who also wrote the screenplay.

The Silent Twins is based on the true story of June and Jennifer Gibbons, identical twins who grew up in Wales. They got the nickname "The Silent Twins" because they only communicated with each other. Both women were committed to Broadmoor Mental Health Hospital for 14 years.

References

External links

1986 television films
1986 films
British television films
Films directed by Jon Amiel